Las Batuecas is a Spanish valley region of the Sierra de Francia in Salamanca Province, Castilla y León.

It is located in the vicinity of La Alberca and is named after the river that runs through Las Batuecas.

It has a monastery of cloistered secluded monks called the Discalced Carmelites.

See also
 Río Batuecas
 Peña de Francia

References

External links 

 Monasterio de San José de Las Batuecas

Tourist attractions in Castile and León
Monasteries in Castile and León
Valleys of Spain